Edward "Ned" Fenlon (October 7, 1903 – September 19, 2010) was an American politician who served as a Member of the Michigan State House of Representatives, as well as a circuit judge in Michigan. He was a member of the Michigan Democratic Party.

Background
Fenlon was born in St. Ignace Township but was raised in nearby Hessel, Michigan. Married in 1939, he and his wife, Jane W. Fenlon, had one child, two granddaughters, and six great-grandchildren. His wife Jane died in 2001 at age of 87.

Education
Fenlon attended Grand Rapids Community College (1923–1925), then attended  Notre Dame University for his undergraduate degree. Fenlon also attended Saint Louis University School of Law in 1928, then getting his law degree from Lasalle University.

Politics and judgeship
Fenlon returned to Michigan after completing his education. He ran for Michigan State Legislature and won in 1933. He continued to hold the office till 1938. During his term he introduced several bills that laid the groundwork for the building of the Mackinac Bridge. He became a Michigan circuit judge in 1951 and continued in that office till leaving the bench in 1974. He was instrumental in getting several civic projects off the ground for Northern Michigan, including the Blue Water Bridge and Sault Ste. Marie International Bridge. He also helped in the building of several Michigan State Police posts.

Retirement
At 106, Fenlon had a home in Petoskey, Michigan and a winter home in California.

Notes

External links
Judge Ned Fenlon Honored by Grand Rapids Community College. St Ignace News. 27 April 2005.
Bridge Booster Ned Fenlon Marking Celebrations of 50th Year of Mackinaw Bridge. St. Ignace News. 26 July 2007.
Judge Ned Fenlon Honored for 1935 Efforts. St Ignace News. 11 February 2006
Michigan legend Ned Fenlon dies at 106 Petoskey News. 22 September 2010
 Legislator details: Edward H. Fenlon

1903 births
2010 deaths
American centenarians
Michigan state court judges
Democratic Party members of the Michigan House of Representatives
Men centenarians
University of Notre Dame alumni
La Salle University alumni
People from Petoskey, Michigan
People from Mackinac County, Michigan
Grand Rapids Community College alumni
20th-century American judges